Berlin-Lichtenberg is a railway station in Berlin, Germany. It is located on the Eastern Railway, Wriezen Railway and Berlin Frankfurter Allee–Berlin-Rummelsburg railway lines in the Lichtenberg district. The station is also part of the Berlin S-Bahn and U-Bahn ( line) network.

During the division of the city, Lichtenberg with its extended railyards became the central transport facility of East Berlin, together with Berlin Ostbahnhof. Today, the station mainly provides regional rail service to the eastern and northern environs.

Overview

The station building marks the southeastern border of the Lichtenberg quarter and is primarily accessible from the Weitlingstraße neighbourhood in the adjacent Rummelsburg locality. North of it, the Frankfurter Allee, part of the Bundesstraße 1/5 highway, crosses the tracks on the eight-lane Lichtenberger Brücke (Lichtenberg Bridge).

Until 2006, international trains to Kaliningrad, Warsaw, Kyiv, Minsk, Moscow and Siberia (among others Omsk, Novosibirsk and Kazakhstan) used to stop at Berlin-Lichtenberg. However, after the completion of Berlin Hauptbahnhof, these trains now stop there. Night trains from all parts of Germany still terminate at this station, however, as do some trains from Warsaw and Kraków.

Lichtenberg was featured in the opening scene of the 2007 movie The Bourne Ultimatum where it was made to look like a Moscow train station.

History
A first marshalling yard at the site was late out in the 1870s, following the opening of the Prussian Eastern Railway line to Strausberg and Küstrin in 1867 and the first sections of the Berlin Ringbahn at nearby Ostkreuz station in 1871. Passenger trains stopped here from 1881 onwards; the station was renamed Lichtenberg-Friedrichsfelde the next year. Long-distance trains, however, ran via Schlesischer Bahnhof (the present-day Ostbahnhof) to the central Berlin Stadtbahn line. The Wriezen Railway branch-off was opened in 1898.

After the area was incorporated into Berlin by the 1920 Greater Berlin Act, Lichtenberg received access to the electrified S-Bahn commuter rail network in 1928. The subway station, built in the New Objectivity style according to plans designed by Alfred Grenander, was opened on 21 December 1930. Zentralfriedhof ('Central Cemetery') was then added to the name; from 1935 the station was called "Bahnhof Lichtenberg". During World War II, it served as an air raid shelter. Train services ceased during the Battle of Berlin on 23 April 1945, but were resumed only a month later under Soviet occupation.

After the war, the Deutsche Reichsbahn authority had Lichtenberg gradually rebuilt as the main train station of East Berlin, providing direct connections with the Ringbahn line and the Berlin outer ring. The track system was extensively remodeled with the construction of the Lichtenberger Brücke viaduct from 1972 to 1976. A new entrance hall was inaugurated on 15 December 1982.

Since German reunification, Lichtenberg station has declined in importance, mainly with the opening of the Berlin North-South mainline in 2006. Nevertheless, large parts of the facilities have been restored and modernised in recent years.

Train services
The station is served by the following service(s):

EuroNight services Paris - Strasbourg - Berlin - Poznan - Warsaw - Brest - Minsk - Moscow
Local services  Templin – Löwenberg – Oranienburg – Berlin
Local services  Eberswalde – Berlin – Königs Wusterhausen – Lübben – Senftenberg
Local services  Werneuchten – Ahrensfelde – Berlin
Local services  Berlin – Strausberg – Werbig – Kostrzyn (– Gorzow Wielkopolski – Krzyz)
Local services  Rheinsberg – Löwenberg – Oranienburg – Berlin
Berlin S-Bahn services  Spandau – Westkreuz – Hauptbahnhof – Alexanderplatz – Ostbahnhof – Lichtenberg – Strausberg Nord
Berlin S-Bahn services  Potsdam – Wannsee – Westkreuz – Hauptbahnhof – Alexanderplatz – Ostbahnhof – Lichtenberg – Ahrensfelde
Berlin S-Bahn services   Warschauer Straße – Ostkreuz – Lichtenberg – Wartenberg

Gallery

References

U5 (Berlin U-Bahn) stations
Lichtenberg
Lichtenberg
Lichtenberg
Railway stations in Germany opened in 1881